The Pamusikatan: 7th PMPC Star Awards for Music (organized by Philippine Movie Press Club headed by current president Joe Barrameda and produced by Airtime Marketing Philippines, Inc. headed by Tessie Celestino-Howard). It was held at the Kia Theatre, Araneta Center, Cubao, Quezon City on November 10, 2015, hosted by Kim Chiu and Enchong Dee with DJ Tom Taus, directed by Bert De Leon. It was aired on ABS-CBN's Sunday's Best on November 29 at 10:45pm.

Nominees
Winners are highlighted with Boldface.

SONG OF THE YEAR
Akin Ka Na Lang – Morisette Amon/ Star Music
Ikaw – Yeng Constantino/Star Music
Mahal Ko o Mahal Ako – KZ Tandingan /Star Music
Mananatili – Sheryl Cruz/ Universal Records
Mr. Right – Kim Chiu/ Star Music
Pare Mahal Mo Raw Ako – Michael Pangilinan/ Star Music
Simpleng Tulad Mo – Daniel Padilla/Star Music

ALBUM OF THE YEAR
All About Love – Yeng Constantino/Star Music
Celestine – Toni Gonzaga/Star Music
Darren – Darren Espanto/MCA Music
Deeper – Julie Anne San Jose/GMA Records
Haymabu – Siakol/Synergy Music Corp
Never Alone – Jennylyn Mercado/GMA Records
Perfectly Imperfect – Sarah Geronimo/Viva Records

MALE RECORDING ARTIST OF THE YEAR
Christian Bautista – Soundtrack /Universal Records
Gloc 9 – Biyahe ng Pangarap/ Universal Records
Janno Gibbs – Novela/GMA Records
Martin Nievera – Big Mouth Big Band/ Polyeast Records
Noel Cabangon – Throwback/ Universal Records
Richard Poon – The Crooner Sings Baccarats/ Universal Records
Vice Ganda – #Trending /Star Music

FEMALE RECORDING ARTIST OF THE YEAR
Jamie Rivera – We Are All God’s Children /Star Music
Kuh Ledesma – Memories /Universal Records
Pilita Corrales – Duets /Viva Records
Sarah Geronimo – Perfectly Imperfect/ Viva Records
Sheryl Cruz – Sa Puso Ko’y Ikaw Pa Rin/ Universal Records
Toni Gonzaga – Celestine /Star Music
Yeng Constantino – All About Love/Star Music

POP ALBUM OF THE YEAR
Celestine – Toni Gonzaga /Star Music
Darren – Darren Espanto/MCA Music
Deeper – Julie Anne San Jose /GMA Records
Never Alone – Jennylyn Mercado/GMA Records
Nadine Lustre – Nadine Lustre/Viva Records
Perfectly Imperfect – Sarah Geronimo / Viva Records
Soundtrack – Christian Bautista/Universal Records

MALE POP ARTIST OF THE YEAR
Aljur Abrenica – Mahal Pa Rin Kita/MCA Music
Christian Bautista – Soundtrack /Universal Records
Gerald Santos – Kahit Anong Mangyari/ Red Light Entertainment Production
James Reid – Reid Alert/ Viva Records
Janno Gibbs – Novela/GMA Records
Martin Nievera – Big Mouth Big Band/ Polyeast Records
Richard Poon – The Crooner Sings Baccarats/ Universal Records

FEMALE POP ARTIST OF THE YEAR
Jennylyn Mercado – Never Alone / GMA Records
Julie Anne San Jose – Deeper/GMA Records
Kim Chiu – Mr. Right/Star Music
Sarah Geronimo – Perfectly Imperfect / Viva Records
Sheryl Cruz – Sa Puso Ko’y Ikaw Pa Rin/ Universal Records
Toni Gonzaga – Celestine/ Star Music

NEW MALE RECORDING ARTIST OF THE YEAR
Darren Espanto – Darren/MCA Music
Darryl Shy – Darryl Shy / Star Music
Edward Benosa – Edward Benosa/Star Music
Enchong Dee – Enchong Dee/ Star Music
Garth Garcia – Garth Garcia/Ivory Records
Ken Chan -Ken Chan /Polyeast Records
Kito Romualdez – Kito Romualdez/ Viva Records
Paolo Valenciano – Silence/Noise / Star Music

NEW FEMALE RECORDING ARTIST OF THE YEAR
Alex Gonzaga – I am Alex G./Star Music
Cherryz Mendoza – Infatuation /Polyeast Records
Hannah Nolasco – Peksman /The Rising Star-Outbox Media Production
Kathryn Bernardo – Kathryn /Star Music
Klarisse De Guzman – Klarisse De Guzman /MCA Music
Kylie Padilla – Seasons/GMA Records
Morisette Amon – Morisette/Star Music

MALE ACOUSTIC ARTIST OF THE YEAR
Darryl Shy – Darryl Shy/Star Music
Kito Romualdez – Kito Romualdez/Viva Records
Noel Cabangon – Throwback / Universal Records

FEMALE ACOUSTIC ARTIST OF THE YEAR
Moira Dela Torre – Moira/ Ivory Music
Sabrina – Love Acoustic 7 / MCA Music

ROCK ALBUM OF THE YEAR
Frank – Franco/MCA Music
Haymabu – Siakol/Synergy Music Corp
Langit Luha – Silent Sanctuary/ Ivory Music
Reo Brothers of Tacloban -Reo Brothers /Star Music
Silence/ Noise- Paolo Valenciano/Star Music
Synthesis – Glaiza De Castro/ Homeworks Entertainment

MALE ROCK ARTIST OF THE YEAR
Franco – Frank / MCA Music
Generation – Generation/ Star Music
Kean – Happy Together / Universal Records
Paolo Valenciano – Silence/Noise /Star Music
Reo Brothers of Tacloban – Reo Brothers /Star Music
Siakol – Haymabu / Synergy Music Corp
Silent Sanctuary – Langit Luha/ Ivory Music

FEMALE ROCK ARTIST OF THE YEAR
Eunice – Happy Together / Universal Records
Glaiza De Castro – Synthesis / Homeworks Entertainment
Yeng Constantino – All About Love / Star Music

REVIVAL ALBUM OF THE YEAR
Big Mouth BigBand – Martin Nievera/Polyeast Records
Duets –Pilita Corales/Viva Records
Mahal Pa Rin Kita -Aljur Abrenica/MCA Music
Memories – Kuh Ledesma/Universal Records
Soundtrack- Christian Bautista / Universal Records
The Crooner Sings Baccarats- Richard Poon/Universal Records
Throwback – Noel Cabangon/Universal Records

COMPILATION ALBUM OF THE YEAR
Be Careful With My Heart The Lullaby Album – Star Music
Himig Handog P-Pop Love Song – Star Music
OPM Fresh- Star Music
Phil Harmonic Orchestra Decade of OPM – Star Music
Phil Pop 2014- Universal Records
The Love Collections from Today’s Biggest Artist – Ivory Music

DANCE ALBUM OF THE YEAR
ADA: The EDM Diva – AiAiDelas Alas/Star Music
Enchong Dee – Enchong Dee/Star Music
Gimme 5 – Gimme Five/Star Music
Trending – ViceGanda/Star Music

DUO/GROUP ARTIST OF THE YEAR
Generation – Generation /Star Music
Gimme Five – Gimme5/ Ivory Music
Harana Boys (Joseph Marco, Marlo Mortel, Bryan Santos and Michael Pangilinan)- Harana/Star Music
Inner Voices – Find Away/Universal Records
Kean and Eunice – Happy Together/Universal Records
Siakol – Haymabu/Synergy Music Corp
The Company – Lighthearted OPM 2 / Viva Records

NOVELTY SONG OF THE YEAR
Boom Panes – Vice Ganda/ Star Music
Lalaki Lang Ako – Janno Gibbs/ GMA Records
Push MoYan ‘Teh – Vice Ganda/ Star Music
Walang Basagan Ng Trip – Jugs and Teddy/ Star Music

RNB ALBUM OF THE YEAR
Journey – Kyla/Polyeast Records
Reid Alert – James Reid/ Viva Records

RNB ARTIST OF THE YEAR
Kyla – Journey /Polyeast Records
James Reid – Reid Alert/ Viva Records

CONCERT OF THE YEAR
Celestine – Toni Gonzaga/DSL Productions and Star Events
Gandang-Ganda Sa Sarili Sa Araneta, E di Wow – Vice Ganda/ABS-CBN Events and Star Events
Lanightingale – Lani Misalucha/ABS-CBN Events and Star Events
Most Wanted – Daniel Padilla/ABS-CBN Events and Star Events
Musikatin – Ogie Alcasid& OPM Artists/Maligaya Development Corporation
The Company 30th Concert – The Company/Solaire Resort and Casino, Stages Production Specialist Inc and The Company
Ultimate Concert – Martin Nievera, Gary Valenciano, LaniMisalucha & Regine Velasquez /StarMedia Entertainment and iMusic

MALE CONCERT PERFORMER OF THE YEAR
Daniel Padilla – Most Wanted
Gary Valenciano – Ultimate Concert
Gerald Santos – It’s Me
Martin Nievera – Ultimate Concert
Ogie Alcasid – Musikatin
Vice Ganda – Gandang-Ganda Sa Sarili Sa Araneta, Edi Wow

FEMALE CONCERT PERFORMER OF THE YEAR
Aicelle Santos – Class A
Alex Gonzaga – Unexpected
Julie Anne San Jose – Hologram
Lani Misalucha – La Nightingale
Morisette Amon – This Is Me
Regine Velasquez – Ultimate Concert
Toni Gonzaga – Celestine

ALBUM COVER CONCEPT & DESIGN OF THE YEAR
All About Love – Yeng Constantino/Star Music
Darren – Darren Espanto/MCA Music
Journey – Kyla/Polyeast Records
Love Revisited – Nikki Gil/ Universal Records
Mahal Pa Rin Kita – AljurAbrenica/MCA Music
Perfectly Imperfect – Sarah Geronimo/Viva Records
We Are All God’s Children- Jamie Rivera/Star Music

MUSIC VIDEO OF THE YEAR
Di Man Lang Nagpaalam – Edward Benosa /Director: Frank Lloyd Mamaril
Ikaw – Yeng Constantino / Director: Cristhian Escolano
Imposible – Gravity / Director: Mark Vincent Villaflor and Paolo Jaminola
Kilometro – Sarah Geronimo / Director: Paul Basinilio
Pare Mahal Mo Raw Ako – Michael Pangilinan / Director: Joven Tan
The Way We Are- Christian Bautista feat Rachel Ann Go / Director: Christian Bautista and Joshua Bautista
We Are All God’s Children - Jamie Rivera / Director: Eric Teotico

Special awards
PILITA CORRALES LIFETIME ACHIEVEMENT AWARD
Rey Valera

PARANGAL LEVI CELERIO
Ogie Alcasid

See also
29th PMPC Star Awards for Television

References

2015 music awards
Philippine music awards